Mihail Makowski (born 23 April 1977 in Maladzyechna) is a Belarusian professional football coach and former player.

He is the twin brother of Uladzimir Makowski.

Honours
Dinamo Minsk
Belarusian Premier League champion: 1997

Dinamo Kyiv
Ukrainian Premier League champion: 1997–98
Ukrainian Cup winner: 1997–98

Azerbaijan Career statistics

References

External links
 Profile at kick-off.by

1977 births
Living people
Belarusian footballers
Association football midfielders
Belarus international footballers
Belarusian expatriate footballers
Belarusian twins
Twin sportspeople
Expatriate footballers in Ukraine
Expatriate footballers in Azerbaijan
Belarusian expatriate sportspeople in Ukraine
Belarusian expatriate sportspeople in Azerbaijan
Ukrainian Premier League players
FC Molodechno players
FC Dinamo Minsk players
FC Dynamo Kyiv players
FC Dynamo-2 Kyiv players
FC Vorskla Poltava players
FC CSKA Kyiv players
FC Hoverla Uzhhorod players
Shamakhi FK players
FC Darida Minsk Raion players
FC Gorodeya players
FC Smorgon players
Belarusian football managers
Belarus under-21 international footballers
People from Maladzyechna
Sportspeople from Minsk Region